Tessa Sanderson  (born 14 March 1956) is a British former javelin thrower. She appeared in every Olympics from 1976 to 1996, winning the gold medal in 1984, and becoming the second track and field athlete to compete at six Olympics. She is the first Black British woman to win an Olympic gold medal. Since 1979, Sanderson has appeared as a guest on numerous television shows as a guest. When Sky News was launched in 1989, Sanderson was a sports reporter for the channel, and she co-hosted ITV's Surprise Surprise with Cilla Black.

The quiz programme Sporting Triangles featured Sanderson as a regular team captain in 1987 and 1988, but she was not asked to return in 1989. She noted that in the new series of the show, all three team captains were footballers, and felt that replacing her with Emlyn Hughes reduced the variety in the show, also claiming that she had ignored invitations to guest on the new series.

Announcing that Sanderson would be a reporter on Sky News, covering all sports and not only athletics, Sky's Head of News John O'Loan said that she had been selected "because her sporting credentials are excellent. On top of that, she has a sparkling personality and she is very intelligent." Sanderson was one of around 30 journalists and reporters on the channel when Sky News launched in February 1989. In April of that year, the Birmingham Evening Mails Paul Cole praised Sanderson's "outspoken enthusiasm" and willingness to express her opinions frankly. David Powell of The Times wrote in 1996 that by the time she started on Sky News, "Sanderson, who appeared in Los Angeles as a curly-haired, round-faced, non-sexy athlete, had realised the benefits of developing her femininity" and that "Her name and make-up survived a two-year battle against her uncomfortable delivery before she was made redundant." Six years earlier, Sanderson had told Powell that her role at Sky was not as lucrative as people might expect, and that some athletes were earning more than she was as a presenter, which was one reason she had decided against retiring from athletics. Sanderson starred in the fitness videos Cardiofunk (1990) and Body Blitz (c. 1992) with Derrick Evans, later known as Mr. Motivator.

During the 1990s, Sanderson appeared in pantomime several time. She twice played Girl Friday in Robinson Crusoe, and was also The Genie in Aladdin and the Fairy Godmother in Cinderella . Justin Cartwright in The Sunday Telegraph, discussing Sanderson's pantomime debut in 1990, wrote that "She plays the whole thing with an amiable smile and the air of someone trying not to bump into the furniture." Her fellow cast member Peter Byrne was quoted by Cartwright as saying that Sanderson was "a natural ... the camera loves her". According to Robin Thornber of The Guardian, the casting of Sanderson, with Russell Grant and Evadne Hinge, proved commercially successful. A Daily Telegraph piece by Robert Gore-Langton praised Sanderson's 1994–95 performance, again as Girl Friday, as "marvellous", while Christopher Day of The Stage wrote that she "seemed confidently at ease in panto". In 1993, Sanderson and snooker player Dennis Taylor were Babes in the Wood in a pantomime edition of Big Break Christmas Special on BBC1.

Performing a "traditional 'dance celebrating the return home of the menfolk on the 2005 Strictly African Dancing special, part of the BBC's Africa Lives season, she was ranked third by viewers. In 2009, she was paired with Ron Atkinson on Celebrity Wife Swap. Atkinson had previously resigned from his role as a television football commentator after making a racist remark about Marcel Desailly in 2004. The episode attracted 1.9 million viewers. In 2012, Sanderson appeared in "Billy's Olympic Nightmare", a BBC Red Button episode of soap opera EastEnders,

Appearances

Television and radio

Pantomime

Notes

References 

British filmographies